The city of Málaga (Spain) is governed and administered by the Ayuntamiento de Málaga (Málaga Council). It is divided in 10 municipal districts, coordinated by Juntas de Distrito, which are subdivided in wards (barrios) and industrial parks:

Notes 

1 Neighbourhood planned or under construction.
2 Former neighbourhood demolished to extend the airport.
3 Green area.
4 Commercial complex.
5 Infrastructures.
6 Public facilities.

References